Gorgasia thamani is an eel in the family Congridae (conger/garden eels). It was described by David Wayne Greenfield and Sean Niesz in 2004. It is a marine, tropical eel which is known from Fiji, in the western central Pacific Ocean.

Etymology
The species epithet "thamani" was given in honour of Randolph R. Thaman, of the University of the South Pacific in Fiji. In recognition for his unending help to the authors in arranging their field work. And recognizing his skill in promoting the conservation of Fiji’s marine and terrestrial fauna.

References

thamani
Taxa named by David Wayne Greenfield
Taxa named by Sean Niesz
Fish described in 2004